is a rather large lake in Ilomantsi, North Karelia, Finland. The lake, which sports 451 islands and many beaches, is located in the middle of wilderness. The river Koitajoki, which is a tributary of the river Pielisjoki in North Karelia, flows from the lake.

Koitere Lacus, one of the apparent methane lakes on Saturn's moon Titan is named after this lake. That lake is located 79.4N and 36.14°W on Titan's globe and is presumed to be composed of liquid methane and ethane.

References

LKoitere
Landforms of North Karelia
Lakes of Ilomantsi